Dan Alexandru Tălmaciu (born 22 April 2002) is a Romanian professional footballer who plays as a defender for Unirea Constanța, on loan from FCSB. He came close to sign for West Ham United in January 2021, but nothing concrete has been achieved.

Club career

Politehnica Iași

He made his Liga I debut for Politehnica Iași against Viitorul on 1 November 2020.

Career statistics

Club

References

External links

2002 births
Footballers from Bucharest
Living people
Romanian footballers
Association football defenders
Liga I players
Liga II players
FC Dinamo București players
FC Politehnica Iași (2010) players
FC Unirea Constanța players
Romania youth international footballers